The Australian Youth Representative to the United Nations is a joint position created by partnership between UN Youth Australia and the Australian Government's Department of Foreign Affairs and Trade. Appointed yearly through a rigorous application process, the Youth Representative holds an extensive nationwide consultation, meeting with young Australian's, politicians and leaders. Each year the Youth Representative travels to the United Nation's General Assembly in New York as an accredited member of the Australian Mission to the UN to deliver a statement on behalf of the young people of Australia. Upon returning to Australia the Youth Representative delivers a report to the Australian Federal Government along with all State and Territory Governments on the year's consultations and key findings along with recommendations.

In 2022 the Australian Youth Representative to the United Nations is Angelica Ojinnaka.

Listening Tour 
Each year, the Youth Representative takes part in a comprehensive national listening tour, engaging with young people across Australia on issues that are important to them along with meeting MP's, Government Officials and NGO's to learn about service delivery, to give advice and to represent the views and findings of young people in Australia. The listening tour usually includes a core theme or questions that is the basis for the tours consultations and findings, in 2021 the question of the tour is: "What would Australia look like if young people were the key drivers of decision making?"

The listening tour, which is supported by various levels of government, UN Youth Australia and the Department of Foreign Affairs and Trade holds consultations and meetings in all Australian States and Territories, major cities and regional towns along with rural and remote areas. Consultations and workshops are held in schools, universities, prisons, juvenile detention facilities and community venues.

Attaché to the Australian Mission to the United Nations 

Each year the Youth Representative travels to the United Nations General Assembly in New York as an accredited member of the Australian Mission to the United Nations, whilst at the UN the Youth Representative will engage with international leaders and deliver a speech representing the youth of Australia.

2018 Youth Representative to the UN, Amos Washington said in his speech to the United Nations Third Committee "There is a misconception that young people are waiting in the wings, yet to experience the real world. However, the issues the young people raised with me affect people of all ages, and are among the many issues that the 2030 Agenda strives to address."

"Young people I met advocated for a kinder society, free from bullying and harassment. In this sense, youth issues are community issues, and community issues are youth issues."

Listening Tour Report 
As part of the Youth Representative program a report is delivered to the Australian Federal Government along with all State and Territory Governments outlining the findings and recommendations of the Youth Representative from their listening tour.

2018 Report Recommendations 

 Lower the Australian voting age to 16
 Alternatives to youth detention always be prioritised
 Schools provide comprehensive, inclusive sex education, and education on mental health, bullying, Aboriginal and Torres Strait Islander histories and cultures.
 The federal government funds additional youth mental health services in regional communities. 
 The Government appoint a Minister for Youth.
 The federal government appoints a fully funded youth advisory council.
 Local and state/territory governments implement inclusive youth consultation strategies.
 The government fully funds a national youth peak body.

Office Holders

References

Australia and the United Nations
Australian diplomats